Zumwalt may refer to:

People
 Alec Zumwalt (born 1981), American baseball coach
 Elmo Zumwalt (1920–2000), U.S. Navy admiral
 Rick Zumwalt (1951–2003), American actor and arm-wrestler
 James P. Zumwalt (born 1956), U.S. Deputy Assistant Secretary of State for East Asia

Places
 Fort Zumwalt Park, a historic site in Saint Charles County, Missouri
 Fort Zumwalt School District, named after a historic homestead fort in the park
 Fort Zumwalt East High School (2007 in St. Peters, Missouri)
 Fort Zumwalt North High School (O'Fallon, Missouri; established 1960, moved 1976)
 Fort Zumwalt South High School (1987 in St. Peters)
 Fort Zumwalt West High School (1998 in O'Fallon)
 Zumwalt Prairie, Oregon
 Zumwalt, Oregon, a ghost town

Ships
 USS Zumwalt (DDG-1000)
 Zumwalt-class destroyer

See also 
 Sumwalt